Crude Set Drama (AKA: Untitled Kinetoscope Comedy) is an 1895 British short black-and-white silent comedy film, produced and directed by Birt Acres for exhibition on Robert W. Paul's peep show Kinetoscopes, featuring two drunken men and a boy squabbling in a small bar. The film was long considered lost but footage discovered in the Henville collection in 1995 has been identified by the BFI as being from this film.

References

External links 
 Crude Set Drama at the BFI Film & TV Database
 
 Untitled Kinetoscope Comedy at Silent Era

British black-and-white films
British silent short films
1890s short documentary films
Black-and-white documentary films
Films directed by Birt Acres
1890s rediscovered films
British comedy short films
British short documentary films
Rediscovered British films
Silent comedy films